João Alfredo is a city located in the state of Pernambuco, Brazil. Located  at 120.6 km away from Recife, capital of the state of Pernambuco. Has an estimated (IBGE 2020) population of 33,328 inhabitants.

Geography
 State - Pernambuco
 Region - Agreste Pernambucano
 Boundaries - Bom Jardim   (N);  Salgadinho    (S);  Limoeiro    (E);   Surubim    (W).
 Area - 133.52 km2
 Elevation - 328 m
 Hydrography - Goiana and Capibaribe rivers
 Vegetation - Caatinga Hipoxerófila
 Climate - Tropical hot and humid
 Annual average temperature - 23.9 c
 Distance to Recife - 120.6 km

Economy
The main economic activities in João Alfredo are based in wood & furniture industry, commerce and agribusiness, especially sugarcane, corn, manioc; and livestock such as cattle, sheep, goats, pigs and poultry.

Economic indicators

Economy by Sector
2006

Health indicators

References

Municipalities in Pernambuco